The Berger House is a historic house at 1120 South Main Street in Jonesboro, Arkansas.

History 
It was built in 1896 by Morris Berger, one of Jonesboro's first Jewish businessmen. The house was home to the Jonesboro public library between 1950 and 1964.

Architecture 
It is a two-story brick structure with a cross gable roof. The house is an example of the Queen Anne style in brick, although it has lost some details (notably its porch and decorative elements on its chimneys).  A two-story turret is capped by a roof with polychrome and varied-shape slate, with a textured frieze board just below its roof line.

The house was listed on the National Register of Historic Places in 1996.

See also
National Register of Historic Places listings in Craighead County, Arkansas

References

Houses on the National Register of Historic Places in Arkansas
Queen Anne architecture in Arkansas
Houses in Craighead County, Arkansas
National Register of Historic Places in Craighead County, Arkansas
Buildings and structures in Jonesboro, Arkansas
Houses completed in 1896